Rotuman may refer to:
anything related with the island Rotuma
Rotuman people
Rotuman language